Sympistis strioligera is a moth of the family Noctuidae first described by Julius Lederer in 1853. It is found from Asia Minor throughout Iran and Afghanistan and Turkestan to the Altai Mountains, Mongolia and inner Asia.

Adults are on wing from June to August. There is one generation per year.

References

External links

strioligera
Moths of Asia
Moths described in 1853